Paul Garner is a British epidemiologist and public health professional, known for his work in Systematic Reviews and Evidence Informed Policy. He is currently an Emeritus Professor, Evidence Synthesis in Global Health, at the Liverpool School of Tropical Medicine. Previously he was a member of the WHO malaria treatment guidelines group from 2004-18.

Early life, education and career 
Paul Garner attended Spalding Grammar School in Lincolnshire in the UK. He received an MB BS from University College London in 1979, and MD from the University of London in 1990.

He started his career in as a physician in Papua New Guinea. There he ran the Aitape Health Center in the West Sepik Province 1982-84, a 100 bedded hospital with a catchment area of 200,000 population. He subsequently worked as a researcher at the Papua New Guinea Institute of Medical Research branch in Madang between 1984 and 1988.

He was a full time Professor of evidence synthesis at the Liverpool School of Tropical Medicine (LSTM) and the Director of the Center for Evidence Synthesis in Global Health, between 2004 and 2022. He now serves as an emeritus professor at LSTM. He is also an honorary research fellow at St. George's University School of Medicine, Grenada since 1997, and honorary Professor at the University of Stellenbosch since 2013. He also acted as the Director of a series of UK Government research and development programmes in evidence synthesis related to problems of the tropics and low and middle income countries, the most recent being READ-It, 2018-2024.  He is a Fellow of the Faculty of Public Health.

Notable contributions 
In 1992, Paul Garner played a key role in the development of the Cochrane Collaboration after its founding. He led the Cochrane Infectious Diseases Group, whose reviews have helped underpin policy changes across the world.

Garner directly contributed to change in the formulation of Oral re-hydration solution and global policies related to its use in treatment of diarrheal diseases using oral re-hydration therapy. At the time WHO used a 311mOsm/L solution as the standard and the systematic review clearly showed that lower osmolarity of 240mOsm/L is more effective.

Garner has worked closely with the World Health Organization in the development of malaria treatment guidelines from 2004 to 2018, organizing evidence synthesis for the three editions in 2006, 2010, and 2015. He played a key role in the introduction of Artemisinin based combination treatments for malaria around the world.

His systematic reviews have also challenged global dogmas, including Directly Observed Therapy for tuberculosis, and routine de-worming of soil transmitted helminths in schoolchildren in living in endemic areas in middle and low-income countries.

Drawing from personal experience, Garner worked to highlight the occurrence of the post-covid-19 syndrome and health concerns related to it. He advocated that the involvement of communities of people who have recovered from post-viral illnesses would be helpful in the management and treatment approaches.

References 

Living people
1955 births
COVID-19 researchers
British public health doctors
British epidemiologists
People educated at Spalding Grammar School
Alumni of University College London
Alumni of the University of London
Cochrane Collaboration people
Fellows of the Faculty of Public Health
Academics of the Liverpool School of Tropical Medicine